Schlüsselkind ("latchkey kid") is the seventh regular studio album by German singer Sasha. It was released by xray Entertainment and Polydor Records on 13 April 2018 in German-speaking Europe. Conceived after his participation in the reality television series Sing meinen Song – Das Tauschkonzert, the German version of the series The Best Singers, in 2014, it is his first album to be primarily recorded in German. Upon its release, Schlüsselkind debuted at number four on the German Albums Chart, becoming his highest-charting project since 2009's Good News on a Bad Day.

Track listing

Charts

References

External links 
 Sasha.de — official site

2018 albums
Sasha (German singer) albums